HLA-B61 (B61) is an HLA - B serotype. B61 is a split antigen serotype that recognizes certain B40 serotypes.

Serotype

References

6